Israel competed at the 2016 Summer Paralympics in Rio de Janeiro, Brazil, from 7 to 18 September 2016.  They are scheduled to compete in sailing, cycling, shooting, and rowing.

Disability classifications

Every participant at the Paralympics has their disability grouped into one of five disability categories; amputation, the condition may be congenital or sustained through injury or illness; cerebral palsy; wheelchair athletes, there is often overlap between this and other categories; visual impairment, including blindness; Les autres, any physical disability that does not fall strictly under one of the other categories, for example dwarfism or multiple sclerosis. Each Paralympic sport then has its own classifications, dependent upon the specific physical demands of competition. Events are given a code, made of numbers and letters, describing the type of event and classification of the athletes competing. Some sports, such as athletics, divide athletes by both the category and severity of their disabilities, other sports, for example swimming, group competitors from different categories together, the only separation being based on the severity of the disability.

Medalists

Athletics 

Men's Track and Road Events

Boccia 

Israel qualified one boccia player for the mixed Individual BC2 into the Paralympic tournament. Nadav Levi claimed his Olympic spot as one of top 12 individual eligible boccia player in the BISFed 2016 World Rankings as of 30 April 2016.

Individual

Cycling 

With one pathway for qualification being one highest ranked NPCs on the UCI Para-Cycling male and female Nations Ranking Lists on 31 December 2014, Israel qualified for the 2016 Summer Paralympics in Rio, assuming they continued to meet all other eligibility requirements.

Road

Men

Goalball 
Israel's women enter the tournament ranked 10th in the world.

Quarter-final

Paracanoe 

Israel earned a qualifying spot at the 2016 Summer Paralympics in this sport following their performance at the 2015 ICF Canoe Sprint & Paracanoe World Championships in Milan, Italy. Pascale Bercovitch who competed in 2008 in the sport of rowing and in 2012 in the sport of hand-cycling earned the spot for Israel. This marked the first time Israel sent a sprint canoeist to the Paralympics.

Rowing

One pathway for qualifying for Rio involved having a boat have top eight finish at the 2015 FISA World Rowing Championships in a medal event.  Israel qualified for the 2016 Games under this criteria in the AS Women's Single Sculls event with a first-place finish by Moran Samuel in a time of 05:25.920. They qualified a second boat in the TA Mixed Double Sculls event with an eighth-place finish by Tsofnat Levanon, Barak Hazor, Nissim Nir Mayo, Shay-Lee Shulmit Mizrachi and cox Danielle Renny Palatin in a time of 04:12.140. Samuel bases her training in Italy where she is coached by Paula Grizzetti.  She also trains in Israel at the Daniel Rowing Center in Tel Aviv.

Sailing

One pathway for qualifying for Rio involved having a boat have top seven finish at the 2015 Combined World Championships in a medal event where the country had nor already qualified through via the 2014 IFDS Sailing World Championships.  Israel qualified for the 2016 Games under this criteria in the Sonar event with a fourth-place finish overall and the first country who had not qualified via the 2014 Championships.  They qualified a second boat in the SKUD 18 event with a sixteenth-place finish overall and the sixth country who had not qualified via the 2014 Championships.  The boat was crewed by Hagar Zahavi and Moshe Zahavi.

Shooting 

The first opportunity to qualify for shooting at the Rio Games took place at the 2014 IPC Shooting World Championships in Suhl. Shooters earned spots for their NPC.  Israel earned a qualifying spot at this event in the R5 – 10m Air Rifle Mixed Prone SH2  event as a result of the performance Doron Shaziri.  It was the only qualification spot Israel earned at the event.

Swimming 

Qualifiers for the latter rounds (Q) of all events were decided on a time only basis, therefore positions shown are overall results versus competitors in all heats.

Men

Women

Mixed

Table tennis

Men's singles

Women's singles

Teams

Wheelchair tennis 
Israel qualified one competitors in the men's single event, Adam Berdichevski.  Israel earned two spots in the quad singles event, with the spots going to Itay Erenlib and Shraga Weinberg.

References

Nations at the 2016 Summer Paralympics
2016
2016 in Israeli sport